Douglass Township is a civil township of Montcalm County in the U.S. state of  Michigan. The population was 2,377 at the 2000 census.

Communities
The city of Stanton is at the southeast corner of the township.

Geography

Demographics
As of the census of 2000, there were 2,377 people, 891 households, and 669 families residing in the township. The racial makeup of the township was 98.06% White, 0.08% African American, 0.17% Native American, 0.21% Asian, 0.46% from other races, and 1.01% from two or more races. Hispanic or Latino of any race were 2.31% of the population.

There were 891 households, out of which 34.5% had children under the age of 18 living with them, 63.6% were married couples living together, 6.8% had a female householder with no husband present, and 24.9% were non-families. 19.5% of all households were made up of individuals, and 9.4% had someone living alone who was 65 years of age or older.  The average household size was 2.66 and the average family size was 3.04.

In the township the population was spread out, with 26.9% under the age of 18, 7.3% from 18 to 24, 27.1% from 25 to 44, 25.7% from 45 to 64, and 13.0% who were 65 years of age or older.  The median age was 37 years. For every 100 females, there were 98.2 males.  For every 100 females age 18 and over, there were 101.3 males.

The median income for a household in the township was $44,309, and the median income for a family was $47,560. Males had a median income of $32,426 versus $24,375 for females. The per capita income for the township was $17,892.  About 2.4% of families and 4.6% of the population were below the poverty line, including 5.0% of those under age 18 and 6.6% of those age 65 or over.

References

Townships in Montcalm County, Michigan
Townships in Michigan